The Grand Larousse encyclopédique en dix volumes ("Big Larousse encyclopedia in ten volumes") is a French encyclopedic dictionary published by Larousse between February 1960 and August 1964, with two later supplements that update the content to 1975.

It is both a dictionary, focusing on the study and the presentation of the words of the French language, and an encyclopaedia, covering all branches of knowledge.  In 1971, Larousse began publishing the much larger 20-volume "Grande Encyclopédie Larousse", with functional dictionary entries diminished, and regular encyclopedia articles greatly expanded.

Online version 
In May 2008, Larousse launched its encyclopedia online. In addition to the verified content from the paper encyclopedia, it is open to external contributors. Each article is signed by a single author who remains the only one authorized to make modifications.

See also
 Grand dictionnaire universel du XIXe siècle
 Nouveau Larousse illustré
 Petit Larousse

References

External links
Official site

French encyclopedias
French online encyclopedias
Éditions Larousse books
1960 non-fiction books
20th-century encyclopedias
21st-century encyclopedias